Music for a Big Night Out is the sixteenth studio album by German hard dance band Scooter.  The album was released on 2 November 2012, preceded by the first single "4 AM" on 7 September 2012. The second single "Army of Hardcore" was released on the same day as the album. It is the last studio album featuring Rick J. Jordan, who left in 2014 after being with the band since the beginning in 1993.

Track listing 
All MC lyrics written by H.P. Baxxter a.k.a. "Bass Junkie".

Editions
A limited edition version of the album features a special T-shirt, which is not available in a regular store.

Credits and personnel 
Credits adapted from Music for a Big Night Out liner notes.
Scooter – producer, performer, programming
H.P. Baxxter – MC lyrics
Rick J. Jordan – mixer, engineer
Michael Simon – mixer, engineer
Marcel Jerome Gialelés (Jerome) – mixer, engineer
Achim Jannsen (Eric Chase) – mixer, engineer
Jaye Marshall – vocals (track 4, 5, 9)
Nikk – vocals (track 8)

Charts

Release history

Notes 
"Full Moon" is similar to "Invasion (ASOT 550 Anthem)" by W&W
"I'm a Raver, Baby" is based on "Loser" by Beck.
"Army of Hardcore" samples lyrics from "Army of Hardcore" by Neophyte and The Stunned Guys.
"4 AM" samples lyrics from "Promise Me" by Beverly Craven, as well as the melody from Otto Knows track "Million Voices".
"No Way To Hide" samples lyrics from "Stand Back" by Stevie Nicks.
"What time is Love?" is a cover of the song of the same name by The KLF.
"Overdose (Frazy)" is based on "Frazy" by Synapsenkitzler, and samples the vocals from "I Wanna be a Hippie" by Technohead.
"Talk About Your Life" is a cover of the song of the same name by Mike Oldfield.
"I Wish I Was" is based on "I Wish I Was a Punk Rocker (With Flowers in My Hair)" by Sandi Thom; the bassline is taken from "The Box" by Ummet Ozcan.
"Black Betty" is a cover of the folk song of the same name.
"Too Much Silence" samples the vocals of Veela from "Lights" by System.

References 

2012 albums
Scooter (band) albums